Tractorul Brașov was a football team from Brașov, Brașov County, Romania.

History
Tractorul Brașov was founded in 1927 under the name of IAR Brașov (Industria Aeronautică Română Brașov) (English: Romanian Aeronautic Industry Brașov).
They won 1935–36 Divizia B, but after lost in League Play-off and miss to qualify in Divizia A for the next season.
Their colours were yellow and blue.

Chronology of names

In 2003, Tractorul Brașov merged with FC Forex Brașov, another team from Brașov who also disbanded in 2011.

Honours
Liga II:
Winners (1): 1935–36

Liga III
Winners (3): 1969–70, 1972–73, 1983–84
Runners-up (5): 1965–66, 1966–67, 1968–69, 1971–72, 1982–83

Notable managers
  Angelo Niculescu (1958–1959)
  Silviu Ploeșteanu (1968–1969)
  Eugen Moldovan (1998–1999)
  Aurel Țicleanu (2001–2002)
  Dorel Purdea (2004)

References

External links
 Labtof.ro
 Foot.dk
 Weltfussballarchiv.com

Defunct football clubs in Romania
Football clubs in Brașov County
1927 establishments in Romania
2006 disestablishments in Romania
Association football clubs established in 1927
Association football clubs disestablished in 2006